Potok is a small settlement on the left bank of the Kolpa River west of Fara in the Municipality of Kostel in southern Slovenia. The area is part of the traditional region of Lower Carniola and is now included in the Southeast Slovenia Statistical Region.

Name
The name of the settlement literally means 'creek, stream'. Warm Creek, a tributary of the Kolpa River, flows through the village.

References

External links
Potok on Geopedia

Populated places in the Municipality of Kostel